MMAC may refer to:

 Mega Man Anniversary Collection, a compilation of video games from the Mega Man series
Mike Monroney Aeronautical Center
 Material Management Aggregation Code, a suffix appended to a NATO Stock Number
 Millions of  Multiply Accumulate operations (MAC) .
 Montana Museum of Art & Culture in Missoula, Montana.
 Mouche Meurtrier, Alen Chien (MMAC), the master chef from TW.